The 2014–15 ISU Grand Prix of Figure Skating is a series of senior international figure skating competitions in the 2014–15 season. Medals were awarded in the disciplines of men's singles, ladies' singles, pair skating, and ice dancing. Skaters earned points based on their placement at each event and the top six in each discipline qualified to compete at the Grand Prix Final, held in Barcelona, Spain.

Organized by the International Skating Union, the Grand Prix series began in October 24 and ran until December 14, 2014. The series sets the stage for the 2015 European, Four Continents, and World Championships. The corresponding series for junior-level skaters were the 2014–15 ISU Junior Grand Prix.

Schedule
The series comprised the following events:

Assignments
On June 28, the preliminary Grand Prix assignments were announced:

Men

Ladies

Pairs

Ice dance

Changes to preliminary assignments

Skate America
 On July 2, it was announced that Stefania Berton / Ondrej Hotarek had split up. On July 22, it was announced that their replacement was Elizaveta Usmantseva / Roman Talan.
 On July 10, Douglas Razzano and Anastasia Cannuscio / Colin McManus were added as host picks.
 On July 18, Samantha Cesario was added as a host pick.
 On August 13, Maylin Wende / Daniel Wende were removed from the roster due to an injury to Wende. On August 22, it was announced that Annabelle Prolss / Ruben Blommaert were their replacements.
 On September 2, Madeline Aaron / Max Settlage were announced as host picks.
 On September 19, Elizaveta Usmantseva / Roman Talan were removed from the roster. No reason has been given. On September 23, Miriam Ziegler / Severin Kiefer were announced as their replacements.
 On September 20, it was reported that Ekaterina Bobrova / Dmitri Soloviev were going to be withdrawing due to an injury to Soloviev. They were removed from the roster on September 29. On October 1st, Alexandra Stepanova / Ivan Bukin were announced as their replacements.
 On September 22, it was reported that Tatiana Volosozhar / Maxim Trankov were going to be withdrawing due to an injury to Trankov. On October 1, they were removed from the roster. On October 3, Vanessa Grenier / Maxime Deschamps were announced as their replacements.
 On October 2, Julia Zlobina / Alexei Sitnikov withdrew. No reason has been given. On October 3, Federica Testa / Lukas Csolley were announced as their replacements.
 On October 10, Cathy Reed / Chris Reed were replaced on the roster by Élisabeth Paradis / François-Xavier Ouellette. No reason has been given.
 On October 17, Joshi Helgesson was removed from the roster due to an injury. She was not replaced.

Skate Canada International
 On July 10, Felicia Zhang / Nathan Bartholomay were removed from the roster. On July 15, it was announced that Madeline Aaron / Max Settlage had been named as replacements. It was revealed on July 16 that Zhang/Bartholomay had split up.
 On August 4, Alaine Chartrand was announced as a host pick.
 On September 8, Valentina Marchei was removed from the roster due to injury. On September 17, Viktoria Helgesson was announced as her replacement.
 On September 16, Kaetlyn Osmond withdrew to an injury. On September 17, she was replaced by Julianne Séguin.
 On September 23, Alexander Majorov was removed from the roster. No reason has been given. On October 1, Zhan Bush was announced as his replacement.
 On October 16, Zhan Bush was removed from the roster due to health problems. On October 21, Stephen Carriere was announced as his replacement.
 On October 17, Nathalie Weinzierl was removed from the roster. No reason has been given. On October 22, Brooklee Han was announced as her replacement.
 On October 27, Kevin Reynolds withdrew due to an injury. He was replaced by Andrei Rogozine.
 On October 29, Elladj Balde was removed from the roster due to a concussion. He was not replaced.

Cup of China
 On September 2, Zhao Yue / Zheng Xun were announced as host picks.
 On September 2, Peter Liebers was removed from the roster due to an injury. On September 9, Alexei Bychenko was announced as his replacement.
 On September 9, Kim Hae-jin was added to the roster, in place of a host pick.
 On September 29, Julia Antipova / Nodari Maisuradze were removed from the roster. No reason has been given. On October 1, they were removed from the roster. On October 9, Jessica Calalang / Zack Sidhu were announced as their replacements.
 On September 22, it was reported that Tatiana Volosozhar / Maxim Trankov were going to be withdrawing due to an injury to Trankov. On October 13, their replacement was announced as Arina Cherniavskaia / Antonin Souza-Kordyeru.
 On October 16, Zhan Bush was removed from the roster due to health problems. On October 21, Kim Jin-seo was announced as his replacement.
 On October 17, Tarah Kayne / Daniel O'Shea were removed from the roster due to lack of training time. On October 22, Natasha Purich / Andrew Wolfe were announced as their replacements. No replacement has since been announced.
 On October 24, Joshua Farris was removed from the roster. No reason has been given. He was not replaced.
 On October 29, Song Nan was removed from the roster. No reason has been given. He was replaced by Guan Yuhang.
 On November 3, Zhang Kexin was removed from the roster. No reason has been given. No replacement has been announced.

Rostelecom Cup
 On July 2, it was announced that Stefania Berton / Ondrej Hotarek had split up. On August 4, their replacement was announced as Annabelle Prolss / Ruben Blommaert.
 On July 10, Vanessa Lam was removed from the roster. No reason has been given. On July 15, it was announced that Ashley Cain had been named as her replacement. 
 On August 13, Maylin Wende / Daniel Wende were removed from the roster due to an injury to Wende. On August 29, Narumi Takahashi / Ryuichi Kihara were named as their replacements.
 On August 29, Artur Gachinski, Nikol Gosviani, and Evgenia Tarasova / Vladmimir Morozov were chosen as host picks.
 On September 8, Valentina Marchei was removed from the roster due to injury. On September 17, Rika Hongo was announced as her replacement.
 On October 2, Julia Zlobina / Alexei Sitnikov withdrew. No reason was given. On October 7, Rebeka Kim / Kirill Minov were announced as their replacements.
 On October 14, Nikol Gosviani was replaced by Maria Artemieva. No reason has been given.
 On October 17, Tarah Kayne / Daniel O'Shea were removed from the roster due to lack of training time. On October 24, Jessica Calalang / Zack Sidhu were announced as their replacements.
 On October 28, Nathalie Weinzierl was removed from the roster due to an injury. On October 30, Eliška Březinová was announced as her replacement.
 On November 5, Alexander Majorov was removed from the roster. No reason has been given. On November 11, Misha Ge was announced as his replacement.
 On November 7, there were a few substitutions to the roster. Adelina Sotnikova and Mikhail Kolyada withdrew due to an injury. Vasilia Davankova / Alexander Enbert withdrew to due health problems. They were replaced by Maria Stavitskaya, Moris Kvitelashvili, and Kristina Astakhova / Alexei Rogonov respectively.

Trophée Éric Bompard
 On August 29, Romain Ponsart and Anais Ventard were chosen as host picks.
 On September 2, Rebeka Kim / Kirill Minov and Miriam Ziegler / Severin Kiefer were added to the roster, in place of host picks.
 On September 16, Kaetlyn Osmond withdrew due to an injury. On September 17, Veronik Mallet was announced as her replacement.
 On September 20, it was reported that Ekaterina Bobrova / Dmitri Soloviev were going to be withdrawing due to an injury to Soloviev. They were officially removed from the roster on October 13. On October 17, Charlene Guignard / Marco Fabbri were announced as their replacements.
 On November 5, Anais Ventard and Romain Ponsart withdrew from the competition. They were replaced by Anna Ovcharova and Douglas Razzano.
 On November 14, it was reported that Anna Cappellini / Luca Lanotte withdrew due to needing to make changes to their program. They were officially removed from the roster on November 17, and were not replaced.
 On November 13, Song Nan was removed from the roster. No reason has been given and he was not replaced.

NHK Trophy
 On July 10, Felicia Zhang / Nathan Bartholomay were removed from the roster. On July 15, it was announced that Mari Vartmann / Aaron van Cleave had been named as replacements. It was revealed on July 16 that Zhang/Bartholomay had split up.
 On August 12, it was announced that Daisuke Murakami, Riona Kato, and Emi Hirai / Marien de la Asuncion were added as host picks.
 On September 29, Julia Antipova / Nodari Maisuradze were removed from the roster. No reason has been given. On October 8, Arina Cherniavskaia / Antonio Souza-Kordeyru were announced as their replacements.
 On October 9, Guan Jinlin was removed from the roster. No reason has been given. On October 23, Jeremy Ten was announced as his replacement.
 On October 14, Nikol Gosviani was removed from the roster. No reason has been given. On October 30, Elene Gedevanishvili was announced as he replacement.
 On October 27, Kevin Reynolds withdrew due to an injury. On October 30, Jorik Hendrickx was announced as his replacement.
 On October 29, Peter Liebers was removed from the roster. No reason has been given. On November 11, Elladj Balde was announced as his replacement.
 On November 9, it was reported that Adelina Sotnikova withdrew due to a torn ankle ligament. She was officially removed from the roster on November 11. On November 17, Anne Line Gjersem was announced as her replacement.
 On November 24, Jorik Hendrickx and Arina Cherniavskaia / Antonio Souza-Kordeyru were removed from the roster. No replacements have been announced.

Medal summary

Medal standings

Qualification 
At each event, skaters earned points toward qualification for the Grand Prix Final. Following the sixth event, the top six highest scoring skaters/teams advanced to the Final. The points earned per placement were as follows:

There were seven tie-breakers in cases of a tie in overall points:
	Highest placement at an event. If a skater placed 1st and 3rd, the tiebreaker is the 1st place, and that beats a skater who placed 2nd in both events.
	Highest combined total scores in both events. If a skater earned 200 points at one event and 250 at a second, that skater would win in the second tie-break over a skater who earned 200 points at one event and 150 at another.
	Participated in two events.
	Highest combined scores in the free skating/free dancing portion of both events.
	Highest individual score in the free skating/free dancing portion from one event.
	Highest combined scores in the short program/short dance of both events.
	Highest number of total participants at the events.

If a tie remained, it was considered unbreakable and the tied skaters all advanced to the Grand Prix Final.

Qualification standings
Bold denotes Grand Prix Final qualification.

References 

Isu Grand Prix Of Figure Skating, 2014-15
ISU Grand Prix of Figure Skating